A roadhouse (Australia and the United States) or stopping house (Canada) is a small mixed-use premises typically built on or near a major road in a sparsely populated area or an isolated desert region that services the passing travellers, providing food, drinks, accommodation, fuel, and parking spaces to the guests and their vehicles. The premises generally consist of just a single dwelling, permanently occupied by a nuclear family, usually between two and five family members.

In Australia, a roadhouse is often considered to be the smallest type of human settlement.

In Britain, the term was often a synonym for an advanced motel, but roadside pub-restaurant or hotel, depending on use, is more common today. A hotel resembling and having a public house (pub) is widely, nationally, called an inn.

The word's meaning varies slightly by country. The historical equivalent was often known as a coaching inn, providing food, drinks, and rest to people and horses.

North America

The "roadhouse" or "road house" acts as a restaurant, serving meals, especially in the evenings. It has a bar serving beer or hard liquor and features music, dancing, and sometimes gambling. Most roadhouses are located along highways or roads in rural areas or on the outskirts of towns. Early roadhouses provided lodging for travelers, but with the advent of faster means of transport than walking, horseback riding, or horse-drawn carriages, few now offer rooms to let. Roadhouses have a slightly disreputable image, similar to honky tonks. This type of roadhouse has been portrayed in movies such as Road House (1948), The Wild One (1953), Easy Rider (1969), and Road House (1989).

Historically, roadhouses sprang up when significant numbers of people began to move to the frontier. In Western Canada they were known as stopping houses. From the 1890s in Alaska and the Yukon, beginning with the gold rush, roadhouses were checkpoints where dog drivers (mushers, or dog sledders), horse-driven sleighs, and people on snowshoes, skis, or walking would stop overnight for shelter and a hot meal. Remains of a Klondike Gold Rush roadhouse can be seen today south of Carmacks, Yukon, along the Klondike Highway.  One built in 1902 is the Black Rapids Roadhouse; another still operating is Rika's Landing Roadhouse.

Australia

In Australia a roadhouse is a filling station (service station) on a major intercity route. A roadhouse sells fuel and provides maintenance and repairs for cars, but it also has an attached "restaurant" (more like a café or diner) to sell and serve hot food to travellers. Roadhouses usually also serve as truck stops, providing space for parking of semi-trailer trucks and buses, as well as catering to travellers in private cars. In remote areas such as the Nullarbor Plain, a roadhouse also offers motel-style accommodation and camping facilities.

Britain

In Britain, the early forms of wayside lodgings of this type are coaching inns. As abroad, they were a place along the road for people travelling on foot or by horse to stay at night, but today they are often pub-restaurants without rooms to rent. Many, especially in rural parts, have kept guest accommodation to become bed and breakfasts or country hotels. With the advent of popular travel by motor car in the 1920s and '30s, a new type of roadside pub emerged, often on the newly built arterial roads and bypasses. They were large establishments offering meals, refreshment and accommodation to motorists and parties travelling by charabanc. The largest pub-restaurants boasted facilities such as tennis courts and swimming pools. Their popularity ended with the Second World War halting recreational road travel, and the advent, post-war, of the drink driving law thwarted the full recovery of the larger instances. Some out-of-town hotels rely heavily on breaking of long journeys, such as at the Dartford Crossing and Firth of Forth. The term 'motel' is rarely used.

Spain
Post houses (casas de postas) were established in major towns and along principal highways. Post masters provided fresh horses, and sometimes carriages and over-night accommodation  for use by Royal officers called Postillones, who were uniformed guides authorised to conduct passengers, goods and messages along specific routes.

In popular culture
"Roadhouse Blues," a song by The Doors
The Roadhouse from Twin Peaks, a local music bar on the outskirts of the main town
Road House (1948 film), directed by Jean Negulesco and starring Cornel Wilde and Ida Lupino
Road House (1989 film), starring Patrick Swayze as a bouncer at a bar

See also
 Charging station
 Fast food restaurant
 Index of drinking establishment-related articles
 Rest area
 Stopping house
 Filling station

References

Restaurants by type
Hotel types
Horse-related professions and professionals
Transport infrastructure
Drinking establishments in Europe
Tourist accommodations